Brunei is competed in the 2019 Southeast Asian Games in Philippines.

Medal summary

Medal by sport

Medal by Date

Medalists

References

South
2019
Nations at the 2019 Southeast Asian Games